Annette Markham is an American academic, Professor at RMIT School of Media and Communication and Professor MSO of Information Studies at Aarhus University, Denmark. She is Director of RMIT's Digital Ethnography Research Centre. She has served on the executive committee of the Association of Internet Researchers since 2013. She has published research in the area of Internet studies, digital identity, social interaction, innovative qualitative methods for social research, and Internet research ethics.

Publications 

Markham has authored more than 50 articles since 1995. Her first book, Life Online: Researching real experience in virtual space, was published in 1998, which reviewers called "a definitive sociological study of what it's like to be on the net" and "a bold move in the exponentially increasingly field of internet studies....that allows the reader to appreciate the challenges of applying contemporary ethnographic methods to online populations." In 2009, Markham edited an internet research methods volume entitled "Internet Inquiry: Conversations about method" with Nancy Baym. In 2020, Markham and coauthor Katrin Tiidenberg published a followup to Life Online in the form of a curated collection involving 30 contributors, entitled Metaphors of Internet: Ways of being in the age of Ubiquity.

Markham has published multiple pieces on Internet research ethics. She is the primary author of the Association of Internet Researchers' official 2012 ethical guidelines for internet research (PDF). The framework of this document uses Markham's earlier published works linking ethics to methods, first in a Norwegian edited volume in 2003 and later in the Journal of Information Ethics. In reviewing ethical frameworks, the Handbook of Internet Studies cites Markham's convincing arguments that "methodological choices inform and are informed by ethical choices." Markham's concept of 'ethics as method' is highlighted in encyclopaedic discussions of research ethics and scientific integrity.

Markham's arguments around qualitative methods focus on the importance of context sensitivity, flexible adaptation, and reflexivity. These concepts have been foundational for developing conceptual frameworks for innovative approaches to fieldwork, methods for online interviewing, or reflexivity in data science Markham is cited as a key figure and 'recommended reading' for researching digital contexts in textbooks and handbooks on qualitative research practice.

Markham maintains a blog about a range of conceptual and pragmatic issues related to lived experience in 21st Century contexts of complexity at http://annettemarkham.com.

Education 

 Ph.D. Purdue University, August 1997, Organizational Communication
 M. S. Washington State University, Edward R. Murrow College of Communication, May 1993, Speech Communication
 B. S. Idaho State University, May 1988, Communication, cum laude

Academic appointments 

 Assistant Professor, Department of Communication, Virginia Tech
 Assistant Professor, Department of Communication, University of Illinois at Chicago
 Associate Professor, Faculty of Humanities & Social Sciences, University of the Virgin Islands
 Professor of Informatics (guest appointment), Umeå University, Sweden
 Professor of Digital Ethics (affiliate appointment) in the School of Communication, Loyola University Chicago
 Professor of Information Studies (MSO, with special responsibilities), Department of Information Studies, Aarhus University, Denmark
Professor of Media and Communication, School of Media and Communication, RMIT, Melbourne, Australia

Books 

 Harris, D., Luka, M.E., &Markham, A. (2022). Massive/Micro Autoethnography: Creative Learning in COVID Times: Singapore: Springer. 
 Markham, A. & Tiidenberg, K. (2020). Metaphors of Internet: Ways of being in the age of Ubiquity: London, UK: Peter Lang. 
 Markham, A. & Baym, N. (2009). Internet Inquiry: Conversations about method. Thousand Oaks, CA: Sage. 
 Markham, A. (1998). Life Online: Researching real experiences in virtual space. Walnut Creek, CA: AltaMira Press.

References 

Year of birth missing (living people)
Living people
Purdue University alumni
Washington State University alumni
Idaho State University alumni
Virginia Tech faculty
University of Illinois Chicago faculty
University of the Virgin Islands faculty
Academic staff of Aarhus University
American women academics
21st-century American women